Thunbergia annua, the annual thunbergia, is a herbaceous upright plant, in the genus Thunbergia, and is native to northeastern Africa. Although it has not been found there, it is a considered a potentially invasive weed in Queensland, Australia.

References

annua
Flora of Northeast Tropical Africa